Thomas or Tom Ellis may refer to:

Law and politics
Thomas Ellis (15th-century MP), in 1421 Member of Parliament (MP) for Kent
Thomas Ellis (1569–1627), MP for Great Grimsby
Thomas Ellis (Irish politician) (1774–1832), U.K. Member of Parliament representing Dublin City, 1820–1826
Thomas J. Ellis (born 1959), Pennsylvania attorney and politician
Thomas Flower Ellis (1796–1861), law reporter
T. E. Ellis (1859–1899), Welsh politician
Thomas F. Ellis (1920–2018), American lawyer and political activist
Tom Ellis (politician) (1924–2010), British Member of Parliament, 1970–1983
Thomas Hobart Ellis (1894–1981), Governor of East Pakistan
T. S. Ellis III (born 1940), American federal district judge

Religious figures
Thomas Ellis (priest, died 1673) (1625–1673), Welsh clergyman
Thomas Ellis (priest, died 1792) (1711/12–1792), Welsh clergyman

Others
Thomas Sayers Ellis, American poet and photographer
Tom Ellis (actor) (born 1978), Welsh actor
Thomas Ellis (Irish emigrant), in 1866 the first European settler in Penticton, British Columbia
Tom Ellis (journalist) (1932–2019), radio and television news anchor
Tommy Ellis (born 1947), NASCAR racing driver
Thomas Iorwerth Ellis (1899–1970), Welsh classicist
Tom Ellis (architect) (1911–1988), English architect
Tom Ellis (rugby league) (1904–1995), Australian rugby league footballer
Thomas Ellis (cattle baron), Canadian cattle baron
Tom Ellis (rugby union) (born 1994), English rugby union player
Thomas Ellis (Tuskegee Airman) (1920–2018) Tuskegee Airman
Thomas Ellis (cricketer) (1828–?), English cricketer

See also

Thomas Ellys (1685–1709), MP